The Union of the Workers of Slovakia (ZRS) was a radical-left party in Slovakia.

History

The Union of the Workers of Slovakia (Združenie robotníkov Slovenska, ZRS) split from the Party of the Democratic Left (SDL) in 1994. In the 1994 parliamentary election the party gained 7.34% of the votes and 13 seats.  Although calling themselves "agrarian-left" the deputies entered the coalition of the national-conservative People's Party – Movement for a Democratic Slovakia and the nationalist Slovak National Party. The ZRS occupied the Ministry of Privatization to ensure that key industries remained under state control. The ZRS stated on its webpage that it had prevented privatizations in the gas industry, energy sector, telecommunications, banks and insurance.

The ZRS had no international affiliations and did not run in the 2004 or 2009 European Parliament elections.

In the 1998 parliamentary election the ZRS received 1.30% of the votes. The ZRS received 0.54% of the vote in 2002 and 0.29% in 2006. In the 2010 parliamentary election the party received 0.24% of the votes – below the poll's error margin of 0.6%.

The party dissolved in November 2017.

References

External links
Official Homepage (archived)

Socialist parties in Slovakia
Defunct agrarian political parties